Arkady Alexandrovich Rylov (– 22 June 1939) was a Russian and Soviet Symbolist painter.

Biography
Rylov was born in the village of Istobensk, in the Vyatka Governorate of the Russian Empire (present-day Kirov Oblast, Russia). He was brought into the family of his stepfather, a notary (Rylov's father had a psychiatric illness). He moved to Saint Petersburg and studied at the Technical Design School of Baron Schtiglitz (1888–1891), then at the Imperial Academy of Arts under Arkhip Kuindzhi (1894–1897).

Rylov was a member of the Mir iskusstva movement and its spin-off Union of Russian Artists, and also a member of the Association of Artists of Revolutionary Russia. He was a chairman of the Kuindzhi Society.

He started as a historical painter (his graduation work in the Imperial Academy of Arts was Assault of Pechenegs on a Slav village) but became a predominantly landscape painter, though many of his paintings have some allusions with Russian history.

Many of his landscapes painted after the October Revolution were seen as symbols of revolutionary freedom. At that time he also painted some typical Socialist Realism compositions like Lenin in Razliv. He taught in the Academy of Arts. In his studio he created what could almost be described as a small nature reserve, with squirrels, rabbits, a monkey named Manka, many wild birds (without cages) and two anthills. According to Mikhail Nesterov wild animals and birds loved Rylov and often came to his studio.

Notable works
Rylov's most renowned works are the Green Noise of 1904 showing a spring landscape with some early Slavic ships on the background and In the Blue Expanse of 1918 showing wild geese flying in the sky over a sea with some sailing ship in the bottom.

See also 

 Fine Art of Leningrad

References

 Rylov at Virtual Museum Canada
 Rylov at Staratel art gallery
 Biography

1870 births
1939 deaths
People from Orichevsky District
People from Orlovsky Uyezd (Vyatka Governorate)
19th-century painters from the Russian Empire
Russian male painters
20th-century Russian painters
Soviet painters
Russian landscape painters
Symbolist painters
Imperial Academy of Arts alumni
19th-century male artists from the Russian Empire
Members of the Imperial Academy of Arts
20th-century Russian male artists